Carndonagh Community School is a secondary school located in Carndonagh, County Donegal, Ireland.

History
Carndonagh Community School was formed in 1972 by the merger of Carndonagh College (a local boys' school), The Convent of Mercy Secondary School (a convent school for girls), and Carndonagh Vocational School (a large established co-educational school).

Dublin footballer Brian Mullins was principal there for a decade from 1991.

The late SDLP MLA and former Deputy Speaker of the Northern Ireland Assembly John Dallat also spent time employed as a teacher at the school.

Education
Education at the school is based on the Irish Junior Certificate and Leaving Certificate curricula. The school was formerly the biggest school in Ireland with over 1600 pupils until a new school was built in the neighboring town of Moville.

The current principal of the school is John McGuiness with Liz Kelly and Owen McConway as vice principals. The student population is over 1000 again at present.

Sports
The school's senior soccer squad became All-Ireland champions following a 2-1 victory over Presentation Brothers College, Cork on 11 March 2016.

Notable alumni
Michelle Doherty, actress, model, TV host
Charlie McConalogue, Fianna Fáil politician and current Minister of State for Law Reform
Frank McGuinness (1960s, Carndonagh College), writer

References

External links
 School website
 History page from school website 

Secondary schools in County Donegal
Community schools in the Republic of Ireland
1972 establishments in Ireland
Educational institutions established in 1972